Julio Villarreal (7 December 1885 – 4 August 1958) was a Spanish actor who later settled and worked in Mexico. He also directed two films in the early 1930s.

Born as Julio Crochet i Martínez Villarreal in Madrid to a family of theater actors, he moved to Argentina and Perú in 1900, then returned to Spain in 1921. After the Spanish Civil War, Julio moved to the United States and in 1932 he finally settled in Mexico City.

He acted in many Mexican movies of the Golden Age of Mexican cinema along with many stars such as María Félix, Cantinflas,  Pedro Infante and Jorge Negrete who became his son in law by marrying Elisa Christy (Elisa Crochet Asperó), daughter of Julio Villarreal.

Selected filmography
 El rey de los gitanos (1933)
 Sanctuary (1933)
 The Unknown Policeman (1941)
 The Count of Monte Cristo (1942)
 Simón Bolívar (1942)
 Michael Strogoff (1944)
 The White Monk (1945)
 Twilight (1945)
 Adultery (1945)
 Dizziness (1946)
 Honeymoon (1947)
 Fly Away, Young Man! (1947)
 Rough But Respectable (1949)
 Philip of Jesus (1949)
 Confessions of a Taxi Driver (1949)
 The Torch (1950)
 Maria Islands (1951)
 The Night Falls (1952)
 The Photographer (1953)
 I Want to Live (1953)
 Take Me in Your Arms (1954)
 The Price of Living (1954)
 Here Are the Aguilares! (1957)

References

Bibliography
 Paco Ignacio Taibo. María Félix: 47 pasos por el cine. Bruguera, 2008.

External links

1885 births
1958 deaths
Mexican male film actors
Spanish male film actors
Spanish emigrants to Mexico
Male actors from Mexico City
Spanish expatriates in the United States